Alice Clark (1 August 1874 – 11 May 1934) was a British feminist and historian.

Life
Alice was a daughter of William Stephens Clark (1839-1925) and Helen Priestman Bright (1840–1927). The Clark family were Quakers, of shoe-making fame - C. and J. Clark Ltd. Manufacturer of boots, shoes & sheepskin rugs. One of Alice's sisters, Dr Hilda Clark, was an influential physician and specialist in the treatment of tuberculosis.

Alice Clark studied at the London School Economics (LSE) under the supervision of Lilian Knowles. Alice Clark argued that in 16th century England, women were engaged in many aspects of industry and agriculture. The home was a central unit of production and women played a central role in running farms, and some trades and landed estates. Their useful economic roles gave them a sort of equality with their husbands. However, Clark argues, as capitalism expanded in the 17th century, there was more and more division of labour with the husband taking paid labour jobs outside the home, and the wife reduced to unpaid household work. Middle-class women were confined to an idle domestic existence, supervising servants; lower-class women were forced to take poorly paid jobs. Capitalism, therefore, had a negative effect on powerful women.

Suffragist activities 
The Clark family were involved in suffrage campaigning. Early in 1913, Alice Clark served on the executive committee of the National Union of Women’s Suffrage Societies (NUWSS). They ran a six week long suffrage pilgrimage, ending in a large rally in Hyde Park. Alice carried a Street Women’s Suffrage banner made by her sister Esther.

Selected works
 Working life of women in the seventeenth century, 1916

References

Further reading
 Berg, Maxine. "The first women economic historians." Economic History Review 45.2 (1992): 308–329. in JSTOR

External links
 Alice Clark, working women’s historian.

1874 births
1934 deaths
British historians
British women historians
Feminist historians
British Quakers
Quaker feminists